Ban Phai Na Bun Junction railway station is a railway station located in Taling Chan Subdistrict, Mueang Saraburi district, Saraburi province. It opened on February 3, 2020 as part of the double tracking of the Phra Phutthachai Freight Line. It acts as a junction for the newly-constructed chord line connecting the station and Nong Bua Junction. Before this, trains had to switch directions at Kaeng Khoi Junction if they were travelling in the direction of Ban Phachi Junction. As it is a freight only station, no passenger trains operate at the station.

References 

Railway stations in Thailand